Macropholidus montanuccii is a species of lizard in the family Gymnophthalmidae. It is endemic to Peru.

References

Macropholidus
Reptiles of Peru
Endemic fauna of Peru
Reptiles described in 2020